Pieces of a Dream is the debut studio album of jazz fusion group Pieces of a Dream released in 1981 by Elektra Records. The album rose to no. 37 upon the Billboard Top R&B Albums chart.

Overview
The album was produced by jazz saxophonist Grover Washington Jr. The song, "Warm Weather", reached no. 54 on the Billboard Hot R&B Singles chart.

Track listing

Personnel

Rachelle Barnes - backing vocals 
Curtis Harmon - drums
James K. Lloyd - Fender Rhodes, piano, synthesizer
Ralph MacDonald - congas, percussion
Cedric A. Napoleon - bass, vocals
William Schilling - guitar
Tamara Scott - backing vocals 
Richard Lee Steacker - guitar
Bonita Taylor - backing vocals 
Barbara Walker - vocals
Dexter Wansel - synthesizer
Grover Washington, Jr. - soprano saxophone

References

1981 debut albums
Pieces of a Dream (band) albums
Albums recorded at Sigma Sound Studios
Elektra Records albums
Rhino Records albums